Charles Warner (13 March 1841 – 29 October 1911) was a Trinidadian cricketer. He played in two first-class matches for Trinidad in 1868/69.

See also
 List of Trinidadian representative cricketers

References

External links
 

1841 births
1911 deaths
Trinidad and Tobago cricketers
Charles